"Just a Little" is a song by English-Irish pop group Liberty X. Written by singer Michelle Escoffery and produced by the BigPockets, it was released on 13 May 2002 as the third single from the group's debut studio album, Thinking It Over. The song proved to be Liberty X's breakthrough to mainstream and critical success, in the process overtaking fellow Popstars alumni Hear'Say in terms of success.

The song reached number one on the UK Singles Chart and reached the top 10 in Australia, Ireland, the Netherlands and New Zealand. The music video features the group as a gang of professional burglars (with two of its members, Jessica Taylor and Kelli Young, wearing tight black latex catsuits) who steal a diamond from an atrium at the Vintners' Hall in London.

Chart performance
Following its release on 13 May 2002, the song debuted at number one on the UK Singles Chart on 19 May 2002, selling 153,000 copies in its first week. It stayed at number one for only a week, being replaced by Eminem's "Without Me". Despite this, the record remained in the chart all summer and ended 2002 as the seventh best-selling single of the year; it also ended the decade as the 87th best-selling single. The song has sold over 600,000 copies in the UK, allowing it to become a platinum-selling hit, and it also won the Best British Single award at the 2003 BRIT Awards. To date, it is the group's only number one anywhere.

Outside the UK, the song experienced major success in New Zealand, where it reached number two and stayed there for six non-consecutive weeks, ending the year as the third best-selling single, behind Avril Lavigne's "Complicated" and Vanessa Carlton's "A Thousand Miles". It also charted strongly in Australia, the Netherlands and Ireland, reaching numbers four, three and two, respectively.

Live performances
On occasions where the group has performed the song live on television, both Taylor and Young wear their catsuits from the original music video. In 2013, when the group performed during the Big Reunion, both members wore a different design of their catsuits.

Track listings

UK CD1
 "Just a Little" – 3:56
 "Breathe" – 3:47
 "Thinking It Over" (Radio 1 acoustic session) – 3:55

UK CD2 (The Mixes)
 "Just a Little" (Bump & Flex Electro Shock Club Mix) – 5:31
 "Wanting Me Tonight" (Wookie Full Vocal Mix) – 4:27
 "Just a Little" (Almighty Mix) – 6:50

UK 12-inch vinyl
 "Just a Little" (Almighty Mix) – 6:50
 "Just a Little" (Bump & Flex Electro Shock Club Mix) – 5:31

UK cassette single
 "Just a Little" – 3:56
 "Just a Little" (Bump & Flex Radio Edit) – 3:22
 "Thinking It Over" (The Wideboys featuring Fat Jack and Miss Shorty) – 5:15

Australian CD single
 "Just a Little" – 3:56
 "Just a Little" (Bump & Flex Electro Shock Club Mix) – 5:31
 "Just a Little" (Almighty Mix) – 6:50
 "Breathe" – 3:47
 "Wanting Me Tonight" (Wookie Full Vocal Mix) – 4:27

Charts

Weekly charts

Year-end charts

Certifications

Release history

References

2002 songs
2002 singles
Liberty X songs
British contemporary R&B songs
Brit Award for British Single
Songs written by Michelle Escoffery
UK Independent Singles Chart number-one singles
UK Singles Chart number-one singles
V2 Records singles